ESL One Cologne is a Counter-Strike: Global Offensive tournament run by the Electronic Sports League, with the first three tournaments being sponsored by video game developer Valve. There have been 7 tournaments by the name so far:

 ESL One Cologne 2014
 ESL One Cologne 2015
 ESL One Cologne 2016
 ESL One Cologne 2017
 ESL One Cologne 2018
 ESL One Cologne 2019
 ESL One Cologne 2020